Thomas Chesney is a British–Irish Professor of computational social science at Nottingham University Business School.

Born in Northern Ireland, Chesney uses simulation to study economic behaviour such as the problem of modern slavery. He is also the coauthor of a widely used textbook, Principles of Business Information Systems.

References

External links
 Personal website at the University of Nottingham

Living people
Academics of the University of Nottingham
Year of birth missing (living people)